Miguel Hernán is a Spanish-American epidemiologist. He is the Director of the CAUSALab, Kolokotrones Professor of Biostatistics and Epidemiology at the Harvard T.H. Chan School of Public Health, and Member of the Faculty at the Harvard–MIT Program in Health Sciences and Technology.

Hernán conducts research to learn what works to improve human health. Together with his collaborators from several countries, he designs analyses of healthcare databases, epidemiologic studies, and randomized trials. He is a Global Highly Cited Researcher. His free edX course Causal Diagrams has had over 50,000 registrations. His book Causal Inference: What If, co-authored with James Robins is also freely available online and widely used for the training of researchers.

Hernán is Editor Emeritus of Epidemiology (journal) and past Associate Editor of Biometrics (journal), American Journal of Epidemiology, and the Journal of the American Statistical Association. He has been a special Government employee of the U.S. Food and Drug Administration and has served on several committees of the National Academies of Sciences, Engineering, and Medicine of the United States.

Education
Licenciado en Medicina, 1995, Universidad Autónoma de Madrid, Spain
Master of Public Health (Quantitative Methods), 1996, Harvard University, USA
Master of Science (Biostatistics), 1999, Harvard University, USA
Doctor of Public Health (Epidemiology), 1999, Harvard University, USA

Honors and awards
 Fellow, La Caixa Foundation, 1995-1997
 Fellow, American Association for the Advancement of Science (AAAS), elected in 2012
 MERIT Award, National Institute of Allergy and Infectious Diseases, U.S. National Institutes of Health, 2018
 Fellow, American Statistical Association, elected in 2019
 2022 Alumni Prize, Universidad Autónoma de Madrid
 2022 Rousseeuw Prize for Statistics, King Baudouin Foundation, Belgium (jointly with James Robins, Thomas Richardson, Andrea Rotnitzky and Eric Tchetgen Tchetgen)

Scientific articles
 Runner-up to Best Research Report, Health Research Training Program, New York City Department of Health, 1994
 Kenneth Rothman Epidemiology Prize, Epidemiology (journal), 2005 (first author), 2021 (co-author)
 Top 10 Article of the Year, American Journal of Epidemiology, 2014, 2015, 2016
 Award for Outstanding Research Article in Biosurveillance (Category: Impact on the field, 2nd prize), International Society for Disease Surveillance, 2016
 Influential Paper, American Journal of Epidemiology Centennial: first author and co-author of 2 of 4 selected influential articles published in the first 100 years of the journal

External links

References

1970 births
Living people
Harvard School of Public Health faculty
American epidemiologists
Biostatisticians
Fellows of the American Statistical Association
Harvard School of Public Health alumni
Autonomous University of Madrid alumni